Victoria Plains is a rural locality in the Mackay Region, Queensland, Australia.

References 

Mackay Region
Localities in Queensland